Haniya, or Al Haniyah, is a town in the District of Jebel el-Akhdar in north-eastern Libya.

References

External links
Satellite map at Maplandia.com

Populated places in Jabal al Akhdar